Bowerno Station is a railway station located in Baureno, Bojonegoro Regency, East Java. Bowerno is the older spelling of Baureno and still used as the name of the railway station.

Services
The following is a list of train services at the Bowerno Station

Passenger services
 Local economy

References

Bojonegoro Regency
Railway stations in East Java